Rukla   is a small town in Kaunas County in central Lithuania. In 2011 it had a population of 2,098. Administrative centre of Rukla Eldership.

The national Refugees Reception Center hosts all refugees coming to the country.

Military base
Five different Lithuanian Armed Forces military units are based in Rukla. Military facilities include the Gaižiūnai military training ground (12,500 ha) and Jonava Air Base. Since 2017, Rukla hosts the NATO Enhanced Forward Presence.

Demographics

Gallery

See also
 Gaižiūnai
 Pabradė

References

 
Towns in Kaunas County
Jonava District Municipality